The Priory Church is an Anglican parish church in Leominster, Herefordshire, England, dedicated to Saint Peter and Saint Paul. The building was constructed for a Benedictine Priory in about the 13th century, although there had been an Anglo-Saxon monastery in Leominster, possibly on the same site. In 1539 the east end of the church was destroyed along with most of the monastic buildings, but the main body of the church was preserved.

Quatrefoil piers were inserted between 1872 and 1879 by Sir George Gilbert Scott.

Bells
The bells of the church are very rare. There are ten now, but the back eight bells were cast by William Evans of Chepstow in 1755. In 1894, two new bells were cast by John Warners of London.

The Tenor weighs 22cwt 3qrts and is in the key of E-flat.

Churchyard
Investigations to the north of the priory in 2005 located the position of the cloister, although most of the stone had been stolen following the Dissolution. Discarded animal bones found on the site when submitted to carbon dating showed that the area was occupied in the 7th century. This agrees with the date of 660 CE associated with the founding myth, which suggests a Christian community was established here by a monk, St. Eadfrith, originally from Lindisfarne in Northumbria.

In the churchyard are graves and memorials of members of the theatrical Kemble family including the grandparents of actress Sarah Siddons. The churchyard also contains one war grave of a soldier of the Royal Army Service Corps of World War II.

See also
 Leominster Abbey
 List of English abbeys, priories and friaries serving as parish churches

References

External links
 "Leominster Priory", Visit Herefordshire Churches
 Photo of West Front

Church of England church buildings in Herefordshire
13th-century church buildings in England
Diocese of Hereford
Priory